The Carson–Newman Eagles are the athletic teams that represent the Carson–Newman University (formerly Carson–Newman College), located in Jefferson City, Tennessee, in NCAA Division II intercollegiate sports. The Eagles compete as members of the South Atlantic Conference for all 21 varsity sports.

Carson–Newman has been a member of the SAC since 1975, when the league was still part of the NAIA.

History
The Eagles previously competed in the National Association of Intercollegiate Athletics (NAIA) as members of the Smoky Mountain Conference, the Volunteer State Athletic Conference (VCAC), and later its successor, the Tennessee Valley Athletic Conference (TVAC). The football team joined the SAC in 1975 when it was still a football-only conference known as SAC-8.

Varsity teams

List of teams

Men's sports
Baseball
Basketball
Cross country
Football
Golf
Soccer
Swimming
Tennis
Track and field (indoor & outdoor)

Women's sports
Basketball
Beach volleyball
Cross country
Golf
Soccer
Softball
Swimming
Tennis
Track and field (indoor & outdoor)
Volleyball

National championships

Team

Individual

Facilities

The college's athletic facilities include Roy Harmon Field at Burke–Tarr Stadium, the Ken Sparks Athletic Complex, McCown Soccer Field, the Silver Diamond Baseball Complex, six tennis courts, a softball complex, swimming pool, and Holt Fieldhouse.

Individual teams

Baseball
In 2007, the C-N baseball team won the South Atlantic Conference Tournament after defeating Tusculum College, who had won more than 20 games in a row, twice in one day.  The team traveled to Tampa, Florida, to compete in the NCAA Division II Regional Tournament. The baseball team returned to Tampa for the NCAA Regional Tournament in 2008 after receiving an at-large bid and finished third, again eliminating Tusculum College.

Football
In 2009, the C-N football team won the NCAA Division II South Regional Championship in Florence, Alabama to advance to the Final Four. Football coach Ken Sparks, a graduate of the school, coached the team from 1980 to 2016 and ranked fourth in most wins among NCAA coaches upon his retirement. Its current coach is Mike Clowney.

Men's soccer
The men's soccer team appeared in the final game of the 2013 NCAA Division II Men's Soccer Championship. They were defeated 2–1 by Southern New Hampshire University.

Men's swimming

Robert Griswold competed for the men's swimming team.

References

External links